Roger Levinge Dean, CBE (12 December 1913 – 7 January 1998) was an Australian politician. Born in Sydney, he attended Newcastle Boys High School and Newcastle Grammar School before becoming a business executive. He served in World War II, 1942–46. In 1949, he was elected to the Australian House of Representatives as the Liberal member for Robertson, defeating Labor member Thomas Williams. Dean held the seat until 1964, when he resigned to become Administrator of the Northern Territory, a position he held until 1970. In that year, he was appointed Consul-General to San Francisco, where he remained until 1974. He died in 1998.

References

Liberal Party of Australia members of the Parliament of Australia
Members of the Australian House of Representatives for Robertson
Members of the Australian House of Representatives
Administrators of the Northern Territory
Consuls-General of Australia in San Francisco
Australian Commanders of the Order of the British Empire
People educated at Newcastle Boys' High School
1913 births
1998 deaths
20th-century Australian politicians